The second season of NYPD Blue, an American television police drama set in New York City, aired as part of the 1994-95 United States network television schedule for ABC, premiering on October 11, 1994 and concluding on May 23, 1995. The show explores the internal and external struggles of the fictional 15th precinct of Manhattan. Each episode typically intertwines several plots involving an ensemble cast.

The season earned three Primetime Emmy Awards, one for "Outstanding Drama Series", another for "Outstanding Guest Actress in a Drama Series" (Shirley Knight), and a Creative Arts Emmy for its casting.  The show received an additional 10 nominations.

Plot summary
Licalsi is found guilty of the manslaughter of Marino and his driver and is given a two-year sentence. Because of his involvement with Licalsi, and the belief that he withheld evidence that could have given her a longer sentence, Kelly is transferred out of the 15th and chooses to leave the department altogether. He is replaced by Bobby Simone, a widower whose previous job was that of driver for the Police Commissioner. This does not sit well with Sipowicz but in time he learns to accept his new partner and, as his relationship with Sylvia leads down the aisle, asks Simone to be his best man.

After an affair with a journalist who uses information that he gives her in an article, Simone begins a relationship with another new officer in the squad, Diane Russell. Sipowicz, a recovering alcoholic, recognizes in Russell's behavior that she also has a problem and, after much prompting, she herself goes to AA. Elsewhere, due to his lack of self-belief that a woman like Donna could love him, Medavoy's relationship with her breaks down, due in no small part to Donna's visiting sister.

Main Cast

Recurring guest roles
Season 2's recurring guest roles include:
 Justine Miceli was introduced as Det. Adrienne Lesniak during the season, in a recurring role as the partner of Det. James Martinez. Miceli became a cast member during the following season.
 Kim Delaney as Det. Diane Russell; Delaney also became a cast member starting at the end of second season.
 Melina Kanakaredes played an ambitious reporter, Benita Alden, who becomes romantically involved with Det. Bobby Simone, the first such relationship Simone has after his wife died.  Simone helps Alden break a story about a major case, though the relationship ends several episodes later when information Simone mentions to her during pillow talk is leaked to the press the next day, resulting in the suicide of a cop.
 Peter Boyle played Dan Breen, a retired officer and Sipowicz's AA sponsor. 
 Debra Messing played Dana Abandando, the sister of Donna Abandando.

Episodes

Each episode entry includes its original airdate in the United States, the writing and directing credits, and a plot summary.

References

External links
Season 2 of NYPD Blue from TV.com

NYPD Blue seasons
Edgar Award-winning works
1994 American television seasons
1995 American television seasons